U.S. Route 380 (US 380) is an east–west United States highway. The highway's eastern terminus is in Greenville, Texas at an intersection with Interstate 30, of which the easternmost 3–4 miles are concurrent with US 69 in a loop around the west and south sides of Greenville.  Its western terminus is at San Antonio, New Mexico, south of Socorro at an intersection with Interstate 25. It intersected with its parent, U.S. Route 80, at Cisco until 1971, when it was rerouted along the former SH 24 from that highway's western terminus near Old Glory to Greenville.  Former U.S. Route 380 from Cisco to near Old Glory became an extension of SH 6.  The highway no longer connects to any x80 route. US 380 passes through some of the far northern suburbs of the Dallas/Fort Worth Metroplex, including (from west to east) Denton, Frisco, McKinney and Princeton. The portion in Texas from the New Mexico Border to Jayton was SH 84 before 1939. Its spur, SH 84A, went from Jayton to Aspermont, until 1930, when it became SH 161.

Route description

New Mexico

US Route 380 begins at an intersection with Interstate 25 just west of San Antonio, New Mexico, and travels through town, meeting the old route of US 85, now New Mexico State Road 1.  It then travels generally east, and marks the northern edge of the White Sands Missile Range.  The road then turns southeast, crossing the Carrizozo Malpais before reaching Carrizozo, meeting U.S. Route 54.  The route continues southeast, climbing the Sacramento Mountains, and going through the town of Capitan and briefly travelling through the Lincoln National Forest, before reaching U.S. Route 70 at Hondo and becoming concurrent with US 70.
These routes continue eastward, next reaching Roswell, New Mexico.  US 380 splits with US 70 in Roswell, then crossing U.S. Route 285 in Roswell before continuing east across oil-producing areas of the Llano Estacado of east New Mexico and the Texas South Plains.

Texas
US 380 enters Texas at a crossing with Farm to Market Road 769, travelling generally due east before meeting up with US Route 82 in Plains.  They continue east passing the former locations of Tokio and Gomez before reaching Brownfield.  In Brownfield, it meets US Routes 62 and 385, and all 4 routes coincide for 3 blocks through the center of town before US 380 splits to the east.

The route continues due east through Texas South Plains farmland, passing through Tahoka, before falling off the Llano Estacado and reaching Post.  The highway then meanders east through rural Garza and Kent Counties before reaching the ghost town of Clairemont.  The route then travels east, where it meets Texas State Highway 70, which both then turn northeast until reaching Jayton, where US 380 takes a sharp turn back to the southeast.  The road then travels through several thousand acres of private ranchland in Kent and Stonewall Counties before reaching Swenson.

The route continues to the southeast, reaching an intersection with US 83, where both continue southeast into the town of Aspermont. The route continues to the east and northeast through the communities of Old Glory, Rule, Haskell, Throckmorton, and Newcastle, before crossing Lake Graham and reaching the city of Graham.

US 380 continues to the east and northeast through Bryson before reaching an intersection with US Route 281 and Texas State Highway 114 in Jacksboro.  US 281 departs southward out of town, while US 380 and TX 114 depart east south of Jacksboro, crossing Lake Bridgeport before reaching the city of Bridgeport.  US 380 then travels due east toward the city of Decatur.

US 380 exits to the east and reaches an intersection with Interstate 35 on the west end of Denton where it is known as University Drive.  US 380 continues through the city of Denton, intersecting US Route 77 and US 377 near Texas Woman's University, before continuing east with US 377.  The routes cross the very northern edge of Lake Lewisville before US 377 departs off to the north.  US 380 continues east through the town of Cross Roads and the city of Little Elm. Then US380 meets the northern terminus of the Dallas North Tollway in Frisco, before reaching McKinney, where it is also known as University Drive.  The route then continues east, passing through Princeton before crossing the northern fringe of Lake Lavon, and reaching Farmersville, where it is signed as the Audie Murphy Parkway.  The route again continues east, passing just south of Floyd, before reaching an intersection with US Route 69 on the far western edge of Greenville.  Both of those routes then follow a loop around the south end of Greenville, before reaching the routes eastern terminus at an intersection with Interstate 30 and US Route 67.

Special routes
The route has two special routes, both business routes in Texas.

U.S. Route 380 Business - F
This is the former route of US 380 through the city of Decatur.  The route was bypassed in 1987, with the old route being renamed Texas State Highway Loop 569.  The route was re-designated as the business route in 1991.

U.S. Route 380 Business - J
This is the former route of US 380 through the town of Floyd.  The route was bypassed in 1968, when the route was still known as Texas State Highway 24, with the old routing being designated as Texas State Highway Loop 462.  The route was re-designated as the business route in 1991.

History

When US 380 was commissioned in 1931, it took over the entire former route of U.S. Route 566, an original 1926 route. The entire route of US 566 was within the state of New Mexico, from an intersection with (modern day New Mexico State Road 48) and (modern-day US 70) east of Ruidoso to US 85 (originally planned as US 466) in Socorro, New Mexico. US 566 never intersected with its nominal parent, U.S. Route 66 although it temporarily connected to that parent indirectly via U.S. Route 366.

The section of highway from the New Mexico border to Jayton was previously SH 84. A spur route, SH 84A, went from Jayton to Aspermont, being changed to Texas State Highway 161 in 1930.

US 380 east of Denton, and west of McKinney, has had numerous fatal vehicle accidents, per public statements by law enforcement and fire department officials.  This is believed to be attributed by the lack of a center median, high traffic volume, and excessive speeds.

Major intersections

See also

Related routes
 U.S. Route 80
 U.S. Route 180
 U.S. Route 280

References

Endpoints of US highways: U.S. Highway 380 and U.S. Highway 566

United States Numbered Highway System
U.S. Highways in New Mexico
U.S. Highways in Texas
3
U.S. Route 380
U.S. Route 380
U.S. Route 380
U.S. Route 380
U.S. Route 380
U.S. Route 380
U.S. Route 380
U.S. Route 380
U.S. Route 380
U.S. Route 380
U.S. Route 380
U.S. Route 380
U.S. Route 380
U.S. Route 380
U.S. Route 380
U.S. Route 380
U.S. Route 380
U.S. Route 380